Koji Matsui may refer to:

, Japanese politician
, Japanese handball player